Mary Anna Bumby (1811–1862) was a British missionary and beekeeper. She was significant for introducing the first honeybees to New Zealand in March 1839.

Life 

Mary was born in Thirsk, Yorkshire, England in 1811. In 1838, her brother Reverend John Hewgill Bumby (1808–1840) was appointed as superintendent missionary for the Māngungu Mission in New Zealand. Mary decided to accompany him as his housekeeper. They travelled on the vessel the James. They travelled from England via Hobart and it was there that Mary acquired two honeybee skep hives. The book “Mary Bumby’s Bees,1839-1841, Myth Fact Mystery” tells the detailed story. She and her brother arrived in the Hokianga on 13 March 1839 and joined the Methodist Māngungu Mission Station on 19 March 1839. The hives were sited in the Mission churchyard.

After her brother drowned in the Firth of Thames on 24 June 1840, she accepted the proposal of Reverend Gideon Smales and married him in 1841. They settled in a small house in the Hokianga Wesleyan Station.

She died in 1862 at sea on a return voyage to England.

References

External links
Māngungu Mission House at Heritage New Zealand 

1811 births
1862 deaths
English missionaries
People from Thirsk
New Zealand beekeepers
New Zealand missionaries
Women beekeepers